Statistics of Lao League in the 2014 season. The league is composed of 10 clubs starts on 22 February 2014. SHB Champasak are the defending champions, having won their first league title in 2013.

Teams 
SHB Champasak
Ezra
Hoang Anh Attapeu
Lanexang Intra FC
Lao Police Club
Eastern Star FC
Yotha FC

Relegation to Lao First Division 
Pheuanphatthana FC

Promotion from Lao First Division 
Lao Army
Lao Toyota FC
Savan FC

League table

References

External links 
Lao League at rsssf.com

Lao Premier League seasons
1
Laos
Laos